The 2022 NCAA Division I baseball season was a college baseball season in the United States organized by the National Collegiate Athletic Association (NCAA) at the Division I level. It began on February 18, 2022, with play progressing through the regular season, various conference tournaments and championship series, and concluding with the 2022 NCAA Division I baseball tournament and 2022 Men's College World Series. The Men's College World Series, consisting of the eight remaining teams in the NCAA tournament and held annually in Omaha, Nebraska, at Charles Schwab Field Omaha, ended on June 26, 2022.

Realignment 
The following schools changed conferences effective with the 2022 season:
 Five schools left the Southland Conference. Abilene Christian, Lamar, Sam Houston, and Stephen F. Austin joined the Western Athletic Conference, and Central Arkansas joined the ASUN Conference.
 The Mid-Eastern Athletic Conference (MEAC) lost three members. Bethune–Cookman and Florida A&M joined the Southwestern Athletic Conference, and North Carolina A&T joined the Big South Conference.
 The Ohio Valley Conference lost Eastern Kentucky and Jacksonville State to the ASUN.
 Northern Colorado, a WAC baseball associate through the 2021 season, left for single-sport membership in the Summit League.
 St. Thomas, formerly of NCAA Division III's Minnesota Intercollegiate Athletic Conference, also joined the Summit League after successfully obtaining an NCAA waiver for a direct transition to D-I.

The 2022 season proved to be the last for MEAC baseball for the immediate future. On July 12, 2022, the Northeast Conference (NEC) and MEAC announced a partnership in which all MEAC members that sponsored baseball and men's and women's golf became NEC affiliates in those sports effective immediately. Accordingly, Coppin State, Delaware State, Maryland Eastern Shore, and Norfolk State became NEC baseball affiliates for the 2023 season and beyond.

In addition to the aforementioned MEAC members, 18 other teams changed conferences after the 2022 season:
 Austin Peay, Belmont, and Murray State left the Ohio Valley Conference. Peay joined the ASUN Conference, and Belmont and Murray State joined the Missouri Valley Conference (MVC).
 Bryant and Mount St. Mary's left the NEC, respectively for the America East Conference and Metro Atlantic Athletic Conference (MAAC).
 Dallas Baptist, a baseball-only member of the MVC, left for Conference USA (C-USA).
 Hartford, which began a transition to NCAA Division III in the 2021–22 school year, left the America East to become an independent for 2022–23 before joining the D-III Commonwealth Coast Conference in 2023.
 James Madison left the Colonial Athletic Association (CAA) for the Sun Belt Conference (SBC).
 Lamar, which had announced it would leave the WAC to return to its former home of the Southland Conference (SLC) in 2023–24, expedited this move to 2022–23.
 Little Rock and UT Arlington left the SBC, respectively for the OVC and WAC.
 Marshall, Old Dominion, and Southern Miss left C-USA for the SBC.
 Monmouth left the MAAC for the CAA.
 North Carolina A&T left the Big South Conference after only one season for the CAA.
 Stony Brook left the America East for the CAA.
 UIC left the Horizon League for the MVC.

Incarnate Word had announced plans to leave the SLC for the WAC after the 2022 season, but days before that move was to take effect, the school announced it was staying in the SLC.

Conference standings

Conference winners and tournaments 

Thirty athletic conferences each end their regular seasons with a single-elimination tournament or a double-elimination tournament. The teams in each conference that win their regular season title are given the number one seed in each tournament. The winners of these tournaments receive automatic invitations to the 2022 NCAA Division I baseball tournament.

College World Series

Coaching changes 

This table lists programs that changed head coaches at any point from the first day of the 2022 season until the day before the first day of the 2023 season.

See also 

 2022 NCAA Division I softball season

References